Mark Pfeil (born July 18, 1951) is an American professional golfer who played on the PGA Tour and the Champions Tour.

Pfeil was born in Chicago Heights, Illinois. He attended the University of Southern California, where he was a two-time All-American as a member of the golf team — third-team in 1973 and second-team in 1974.  While playing for the Trojans, Pfeil and his teammates, including future Masters champion Craig Stadler, lead them to a seventh-place finish at the NCAA Championship in 1973, and a fourth-place finish a year later. Pfeil was a member of the 1973 Walker Cup team. He turned professional in 1974 and joined the PGA Tour in 1976.

Pfeil had 12 top-10 finishes including a win at the 1980 Tallahassee Open during his PGA Tour career. His best finish in a major was T-22 at the 1982 PGA Championship. His best year was 1984, when he finished 69th on the money list with $101,878. In his forties, he accepted an assistant coaching position at USC and was involved in corporate golf exhibitions, mainly for Toyota.

After turning 50 in July 2001, Pfeil began play on the Champions Tour. His best finish in this venue was T-10 at the 2002 NFL Golf Classic.

Pfeil lives in Palos Verdes Estates, California. He holds the course record (59) at Palos Verdes Golf Club (par-71).

Amateur wins
1972 Pacific Coast Amateur
1973 Southern California Amateur
1974 PAC-8 Conference Championship (individual), Pacific Coast Amateur

Professional wins (4)

PGA Tour wins (1)

Other wins (3)
1976 Spalding Invitational
1983 Anderson-Pacific Classic
1985 Jerry Ford Invitational

Results in major championships

CUT = missed the half-way cut
"T" indicates a tie for a place

U.S. national team appearances
Amateur
Walker Cup: 1973 (winners)

See also 

 Fall 1975 PGA Tour Qualifying School graduates
Fall 1976 PGA Tour Qualifying School graduates

References

External links

American male golfers
USC Trojans men's golfers
PGA Tour golfers
PGA Tour Champions golfers
Golfers from Illinois
Golfers from California
People from Chicago Heights, Illinois
People from Palos Verdes Estates, California
1951 births
Living people